Pacific East Asia Cargo Airlines, Inc. was a cargo airline based in Pasay, Philippines. The carrier served domestic services from the Philippines with two Boeing 727 freighter aircraft. The airline also had an agreement on selected routes flown by Air Philippines. PEAC was also an affiliate airline of TNT Airways, with PEAC operating TNT leased BAe 146 aircraft.

History 
On October 9, 1990, Pacific East Asia Cargo Airlines, Inc. (PEAC) was officially formed and on the 20th of December 1991 was granted a certificate of public convenience and necessity (CPCN) to operate scheduled international all-cargo services.

On the September 1, 1999, the airline came to a cargo agreement with local airline, Air Philippines. During 2002 the airline operated freighter flights to Hong Kong using A300F type aircraft leased from the Turkish Airline, MNG Airlines, freighter flights to Taipei using a Boeing 727F and domestic freighter flights to Cebu and Clark utilizing another B727 freighter.

In the period 2007 to 2011, PEAC was the fifth largest cargo carrier in the Philippines with a market share of 3.17%, transporting 23.3 million kilograms.

But on March 19, 2010, its air operator's certificate was suspended, and eleven days later on March 30, the airline was added to the European list of banned air carriers until June 25, 2015. By the end of 2010, the company ceased operations.

Services
Pacific East Asia Cargo Airlines (PEAC) served domestic and regional destinations around the Philippines and surrounding region with a fleet of 727 freighter aircraft and a variety of leased aircraft. The airline also had an agreement with domestic carrier, Air Philippines, to codeshare selected cargo operations to airports that Air Philippines operates to. During a tie-up with TNT, PEAC leased four Bae 146 aircraft from TNT Airways, at the end of the lease in 1999 the aircraft were returned to Europe. The TNT-PEAC joint-venture also considered re-locating the airline's hub from Manila's Ninoy Aquino International Airport to nearby Olongapo's Subic Bay International Airport.

In June 2006, PEAC resumed its three times weekly Angeles-Clark (Angeles City) – Taipei all-cargo services, utilizing a B727-200F freighter. This was in addition to PEAC's five times weekly service between Cebu and Angeles-Clark utilizing a B727-100 freighter with aircraft registry RPC-5353, operating since 2002.

Former destinations 
Pacific East Asia Cargo Airlines (PEAC) served the following Destinations (May 2008). This also included cargo flights with their Air Philippines Agreement. The Airline also offers its 727 aircraft for charter services.

Philippines
Luzon
Angeles City (Clark International Airport)
Legazpi (Legazpi Airport)
Manila (Ninoy Aquino International Airport)
Puerto Princesa (Puerto Princesa Airport)
Tuguegarao (Tuguegarao Airport)
Visayas
Bacolod (Bacolod–Silay International Airport)
Cebu (Mactan–Cebu International Airport)
Dumaguete (Sibulan Airport)
Iloilo (Iloilo International Airport)
Mindanao
Cagayan de Oro (Laguindingan International Airport)
Davao (Francisco Bangoy International Airport)
General Santos (General Santos International Airport)
Zamboanga (Zamboanga International Airport)

Republic of China (Taiwan)
Taipei (Taiwan Taoyuan International Airport)

References:

People's Republic of China
Hong Kong (Hong Kong International Airport)
Hong Kong (Kai Tak Airport)

Singapore
Singapore (Singapore Changi Airport)

South Korea
Seoul (Incheon International Airport)

Indonesia
Jakarta (Soekarno-Hatta International Airport)

References:

Fleet 

(not including Boeing 737 Cargo flights operated on behalf of Air Philippines)

References:

Former 
4 Bae 146 (Lease from TNT Airways)
1 Airbus A300F
1 Boeing 737-200F

Accidents and incidents
On 21 April 2010, Flight 7815, an Antonov An-12 with registration UP-AN216, crashed on approach to Clark International Airport, Philippines, after a fire broke out in flight. It was initially reported to be operated by PEAC but was operated actually by Interisland Airlines.

References

External links 

 

Airlines established in 1990
Cargo airlines of the Philippines
Companies based in Pasay
Defunct airlines of the Philippines
Airlines disestablished in 2010
Philippine companies established in 1990